Kesaram is a village in Yadadri Bhuvanagiri district of Telangana, India. It is administered under Bhongir mandal.

References

Villages in Nalgonda district